Mir Shakil-ur-Rahman, in short MSR, (born 8 January 1957) is a Pakistani media mogul and business man. He is the founder of 24-hour news cycle network, Geo TV.

In addition, he is the owner of the Jang Group of Newspapers and the News International, that was started by his father Mir Khalil ur Rehman and part owner of the Independent Media Corporation. This media group publishes a number of newspapers and magazines in Urdu and English. IMC also owns the Geo TV network.

Early life 
He was born to a Kashmiri family. His father Mir Khalil ur Rehman founded Jang Group. Mir Shakil-ur-Rehman attended St Patrick's High School, Karachi and is listed among the famous personalities of Pakistan that attended this high school.

Career 
In the late 1990s, during Nawaz Sharif's second term as Prime Minister, Shakil was first asked by Sharif's government to dismiss some of the staff members of the Jang Group.
Keeping in line with the tradition of the media group that was founded by Mir Shakil's father, Mir Khalil ur Rehman, Shakil refused to dismiss the staff, a number of tax evasion cases were filed against his news group amounting to 40 million US dollars, followed by freezing of bank accounts and seizure of their assets. The government withdrew their court cases after some facts were made public by Shakil.
Shakil founded Geo TV in May 2002. Shakil established a television channel network by the name of Geo TV in May 2002.
He was arrested by the NAB on 12 March 2020 on the allegations of getting 52 kanal land in Lahore by that time Chief Minister of Punjab Nawaz Sharif.

Media industry associations
Mir Shakil ur Rahman has also served as president of All Pakistan Newspapers Society in 2006. He remained a convener of the 'Wage Board Committee' of the society in 2010. He was the president of the Council of Pakistan Newspaper Editors in 1995–96 and again in 2003–04 and also the president of Pakistan Broadcasters Association (PBA) in 2005. Shakil served as a member of the Press Council of Pakistan in 2013. He owns multiple media outlets such as Jang News, Geo News TV channel, The News, and others.

He is the youngest son of late Mir Khalil ur Rehman (1927–1992) who was the founder and editor of the Jang newspaper.

References

Pakistani businesspeople
Geo TV executives
Living people
St. Patrick's High School, Karachi alumni
Pakistani expatriates in the United Arab Emirates
Rahman family
Pakistani male journalists
Pakistani philanthropists
People named in the Panama Papers
Pakistani mass media owners
Pakistani people of Kashmiri descent
Pakistani prisoners and detainees
1970 births
Pakistanis named in the Pandora Papers